Xihui Park is a key state park of China located west of Wuxi in eastern China's Jiangsu province. It was established in 1958 and commands historically famous views overlooking the city, the adjacent Grand Canal, and nearby Lake Tai. Its grounds include the Jichang Garden, the Second Spring under Heaven, the Dragon Light Pagoda, and a cable car connecting the park to the summit of Mount Hui.

Local legend purports that Xishan was once visited by the emperor Shi Huangdi.

Name 
The park is named for Mount Xi (t , s , Xīshān, lit. "Tin Hill") on its grounds and for nearby Mount Hui (lit. "Kindhearted Hill"), which is administered separately as the Huishan National Forest Park.

Features

Garden 

Jichang Garden is a famous traditional Chinese garden.

Spring 

The Second Spring under Heaven was the inspiration for the blind erhu player Abing's most famous composition, the Erquan Yingyue.

Pagoda 

Dragon Light Pagoda (t , s , Lóngguāng Tǎ) is a seven-story brick-and-wood octagonal pagoda located at the crest of Xishan. It commands a traditional scenic view of nearby Lake Tai and the Grand Canal running through Wuxi, but a cable car between Xihui Park and the crest of Mount Hui (elev. ) now offers a higher vantage point.

Constructed as a temple during the Ming dynasty, the original pagoda burnt during the Qing and was subsequently rebuilt. The pagoda's grounds were used as a "beggar's refuge" for the housing and training of Wuxi's indigent poor during the Republican period. As the city is named for the hill it stands on, the pagoda is sometimes used as a symbol of Wuxi.

References 

Parks in Wuxi
Tourist attractions in Jiangsu